The Sherman School is a school district and public elementary and middle school of Sherman, Connecticut.

It opened in 1937 as a consolidation of various schools; the community voted to consolidate on April 18, 1936.

References

External links
 

School districts in Connecticut
Public elementary schools in Connecticut
Public middle schools in Connecticut
1937 establishments in Connecticut
Educational institutions established in 1937
Schools in Fairfield County, Connecticut